René Centellas (born 31 May 1960) is a former boxer from Bolivia, who competed in the flyweight (- 51 kg) division at the 1984 Summer Olympics. Centellas lost his opening bout to Jeff Fenech of Australia.

References

1960 births
Living people
Flyweight boxers
Olympic boxers of Bolivia
Boxers at the 1984 Summer Olympics
Bolivian male boxers